Cadena Salsoul is an entertainment-focused salsa radio network in Puerto Rico.

The SalSoul Network, made up of two simulcast FM facilities, has been top rated in every significant demographic since 1986. In the important age groups, the network often doubled the audience of the number two station in this market of 125 stations and 3.5 million persons.

The WPRM-FM and WIVA-FM network made up the first instance in the U.S. of using two FM signals to cover all of a large market. WPRM covers San Juan and Ponce; WIVA covers Mayagüez and Arecibo. They also added WRIO Ponce to the network. Together, they cover the "consolidated" market favored by advertising agencies. In a survey conducted in 2015, listeners ranked them the third best station, after KQ 105 FM and Z-93 FM. Through use of parallel clustering, spots could be sold locally on either signal for smaller retail accounts.

Since June 24, 2013 and after 58 years broadcasting on the frequency of 98.5 FM, the radio station, with the approval of the Federal Communications Commission in the United States, has changed to 99.1 FM for the best coverage.

Programming
 La Perrera
 Móntala con Salsoul
 El Show de Jesse y Bebe
 El Bollete
 SalSoul en la Noche

References

External links
 
 Propulsor de una radio revolucionaria (Spanish)
 
 
 

Radio stations in Puerto Rico
Radio stations established in 1959
1959 establishments in Puerto Rico
Salsa music